Guthrie Castle is a castle and country house in Angus, Scotland. The castle dates back to the 15th century, although much of the present building is of 19th-century origin. It is now a private house.

History
Guthrie Castle comprises a tower house, originally built by Sir David Guthrie (1435–1500), Treasurer and Lord Justice-General of Scotland, in 1468. The Guthrie family later built a house beside the tower. In 1848, the two were linked by a baronial style expansion, to designs by David Bryce.  The historic keep remained in the Guthrie family until 1983, with the death of Colonel Ivan Guthrie.

Restoration 
In 1984 Guthrie Castle was purchased by Daniel S. Peña, Sr., an American businessman. Peña restored the castle to its 19th-century condition, and built a golf course within the estate in 1994/95. In 2003, the castle and its grounds were opened to the public, for wedding parties, corporate functions and for group bookings. In 2017, after a fraud investigation, the owners decided that it will no longer be open to the public and will remain a private house.

References

External links 

 Guthrie Castle web site 
 Guthrie Castle, Gazetteer for Scotland

Castles in Angus, Scotland
Category B listed buildings in Angus, Scotland
Listed castles in Scotland
Inventory of Gardens and Designed Landscapes
Tower houses in Scotland